Van Buren Lake is a lake in Hancock County, Ohio, in the United States. The lake is formed by a dam on Rocky Ford Creek, which was built in 1939.

Van Buren Lake was named after Martin Van Buren, 8th President of the United States.

See also
List of lakes in Ohio

References

Lakes of Ohio
Bodies of water of Hancock County, Ohio